Thymidylate kinase also known as deoxythymidylate kinase or dTMP kinase is an enzyme that in humans is encoded by the DTYMK gene. and belongs to thymidylate kinase family of proteins.

References

Further reading